A partial solar eclipse occurred on June 10, 1964. A solar eclipse occurs when the Moon passes between Earth and the Sun, thereby totally or partly obscuring the image of the Sun for a viewer on Earth. A partial solar eclipse occurs in the polar regions of the Earth when the center of the Moon's shadow misses the Earth.

Related eclipses

Solar eclipses of 1964–1967

Metonic series

References

External links 

1964 06 10
1964 in science
1964 06 10
June 1964 events